The 2011 Pittsburgh Steelers season was the franchise's 79th season as a professional sports franchise and as a member of the National Football League (NFL). It was the twelfth season under the leadership of general manager Kevin Colbert and the fifth under head coach Mike Tomlin. The Steelers hoped to return to the Super Bowl and defend their AFC championship from 2010, but suffered a 29–23 overtime loss to the Denver Broncos in the Wild Card round of the playoffs. The Steelers played all of their home games at Heinz Field in Pittsburgh, Pennsylvania.

The Steelers' defense allowed the fewest points, passing yards, and total yards in the 2011 NFL season.

As of 2022, the only remaining member of the 2011 squad playing as a Steeler is Cameron Heyward.

Staff

Offseason

2011 NFL Draft

Draft notes

Preseason

Schedule

Regular season

Schedule

Game summaries

Week 1: at Baltimore Ravens

The Steelers opened up their regular season on the road against their old AFC North division rivals, the Baltimore Ravens. The Ravens scored quickly on their first drive, when only three plays into the game, Baltimore wide receiver Anquan Boldin caught a 27-yard touchdown pass from quarterback Joe Flacco. The Ravens scored again on the ensuing drive when running back Ray Rice ran in a 1-yard touchdown, putting Baltimore on top 14–0 early in the first quarter. The Steelers battled back on the next drive, driving down to the Ravens 11-yard line. Pittsburgh scored on a third-and-goal play when wide receiver Emmanuel Sanders caught a touchdown in the back of the end zone from quarterback Ben Roethlisberger. The Ravens responded by scoring again, this time on an 11-yard pass from Flacco to Rice. At halftime the Ravens led 21–7, just like in the 2010 playoffs. But unlike that game, the Ravens did not let up their dominance in the second half. On Pittsburgh's first play from scrimmage in the second quarter, Ravens defensive lineman Haloti Ngata stripped Roethlisberger of the football and recovered it at the Steelers 18-yard line. The Ravens scored yet again when tight end Ed Dickson caught an 18-yard touchdown pass from Joe Flacco. A two-point conversion by punter/holder Sam Koch put the Ravens on top 29–7. The Ravens never looked back, and put up two more Billy Cundiff field goals to close out the game 35–7. The Steelers finished with 7 turnovers in the game. The loss marked the Steelers first opening day loss in 8 years, and left Pittsburgh at the bottom of the division with an 0–1 record.

Week 2: vs. Seattle Seahawks

Hoping to rebound from their Week 1 divisional loss to the Ravens, the Steelers played their home-opener against the Seattle Seahawks at Heinz Field. After a failed 4th and goal run on their first drive, Pittsburgh delivered the game's first punch with a 1-yard touchdown run from running back Rashard Mendenhall. This score on their second drive gave them the early lead.  The Steelers added onto their lead in the second quarter with a 20-yard touchdown run from running back Isaac Redman, followed by a 20-yard field goal from kicker Shaun Suisham.  Pittsburgh's offense made one last score in the third quarter with quarterback Ben Roethlisberger finding wide receiver Mike Wallace on a 2-yard touchdown pass.  From there, the defense prevented any scoring attempt from Seattle's offense.

With the shutout win, the Steelers improved to 1–1.

Week 3: at Indianapolis Colts

Coming off their shutout home win over the Seahawks, the Steelers flew to Lucas Oil Stadium for a primetime game against the Indianapolis Colts on Sunday night (Pittsburgh's first primetime game of the year).  Pittsburgh scored first in the first quarter with a 48-yard field goal by kicker Shaun Suisham, followed by quarterback Ben Roethlisberger finding wide receiver Mike Wallace on an 81-yard touchdown pass.  The Colts answered in the second quarter with kicker Adam Vinatieri getting a 21-yard field goal, followed by defensive end Jamaal Anderson returning a Roethlisberger fumble caused by Dwight Freeney 47 yards for a touchdown. Vinatieri got another 25-yard field goal before the end of the half.  After a scoreless third quarter, the Steelers regained the lead in the fourth quarter with a 44-yard field goal from Suisham, followed by safety Troy Polamalu returning a fumble forced by James Harrison 16 yards for a touchdown.  However, Indianapolis replied with running back Joseph Addai getting a 6-yard touchdown run. Pittsburgh prevailed, however, with Shuisham hitting a game-winning 38-yard field goal with 4 seconds remaining.

With the win, the Steelers improved to 2–1.

Week 4: at Houston Texans

Coming off their Sunday night win over the Colts, the Steelers flew to Reliant Stadium in Houston for a duel with the Houston Texans.  Pittsburgh trailed late in the first quarter when Texans quarterback Matt Schaub completed a 1-yard touchdown pass to tight end Owen Daniels.  Houston would add onto their lead in the second quarter with kicker Neil Rackers getting a 25-yard field goal.

The Steelers finally answered in the third quarter with a 3-yard touchdown run from running back Rashard Mendenhall. Pittsburgh would tie the game in the fourth quarter with a 26-yard field goal from kicker Shaun Suisham, but the Texans retook the lead when running back Arian Foster got a 42-yard touchdown run. The Steelers were unable to rally, and Big Ben was intercepted on the Steelers' final drive.

With the loss, the Steelers fell to 2–2.

Week 5: vs. Tennessee Titans

Hoping to rebound from their road loss to the Texans, the Steelers went home for a Week 5 intraconference duel with the Tennessee Titans.  Pittsburgh trailed early in the first quarter as Titans kicker Rob Bironas got a 29-yard field goal, yet the Steelers answered with quarterback Ben Roethlisberger finding tight end Heath Miller on an 8-yard touchdown pass.  Pittsburgh would add onto their lead in the second quarter with Roethlisberger hooking up with wide receiver Hines Ward and fullback David Johnson on a 7-yard and a 1-yard touchdown pass.

The Steelers continued their dominating day in the third quarter with Roethlisberger connecting with Ward again on a 5-yard touchdown pass.  Tennessee responded with running back Chris Johnson getting a 1-yard touchdown run.  Afterwards, the Steelers would pull away in the fourth quarter with a 19-yard field goal from kicker Shaun Suisham.  The Titans tried to rally with quarterback Matt Hasselbeck completing a 19-yard touchdown pass to wide receiver Damian Williams, yet Pittsburgh closed out the game with Roethlisberger finding wide receiver Mike Wallace on a 40-yard touchdown pass.

With the win, the Steelers improved to 3–2.

Week 6: vs. Jacksonville Jaguars

Coming off their home win over the Titans, the Steelers closed out their intraconference schedule at home in a Week 6 duel with the Jacksonville Jaguars.  Pittsburgh delivered the game's opening punch in the first quarter with an 8-yard touchdown run from running back Rashard Mendenhall.  The Steelers would add onto their lead in the second quarter with quarterback Ben Roethlisberger finding wide receiver Mike Wallace on a 28-yard touchdown pass, followed by a 21-yard field goal from kicker Shaun Suisham.  The Jaguars would close out the half with kicker Josh Scobee making a 46-yard field goal.

Jacksonville crept closer in the third quarter with quarterback Blaine Gabbert completing an 18-yard touchdown pass to wide receiver Jason Hill.  The Jaguars tried to rally in the fourth quarter with Scobee getting a 45-yard field goal, yet Pittsburgh's defense held on to preserve the victory.

With the win, the Steelers improved to 4–2.

Week 7: at Arizona Cardinals

Coming off their win over the Jaguars, the Steelers flew to the University of Phoenix Stadium for a Week 7 interconference duel with the Arizona Cardinals, in a rematch of Super Bowl XLIII.  Pittsburgh delivered the game's opening punch in the first quarter as quarterback Ben Roethlisberger found tight end Heath Miller on a 12-yard touchdown pass.  The Steelers would add onto their lead in the second quarter with Roethlisberger hooking up with wide receiver Mike Wallace on a 95-yard touchdown pass.  The Cardinals would answer with running back Alfonso Smith getting a 1-yard touchdown run.  Pittsburgh would close out the half with a 41-yard field goal from kicker Shaun Suisham.

Arizona began the third quarter with quarterback Kevin Kolb completing a 73-yard touchdown pass to running back LaRod Stephens-Howling, yet the Steelers responded with Roethlisberger connecting to wide receiver Emmanuel Sanders on a 4-yard touchdown pass, along with Kolb getting called for intentional grounding in his endzone, resulting in a safety.  In the fourth quarter, the Steelers continued to pull away with a 42-yard and a 39-yard field goal from Suisham.  The Cardinals tried to rally with Kolb completing a 2-yard touchdown pass to wide receiver Early Doucet (with a failed two-point conversion), yet Pittsburgh held on to preserve the victory.

With the win, the Steelers improved to 5–2.

Week 8: vs. New England Patriots

Coming off their road win over the Cardinals, the Steelers went home for a Week 8 duel with the New England Patriots.  Pittsburgh delivered the game's opening punch in the first quarter as quarterback Ben Roethlisberger found running back Mewelde Moore on a 5-yard touchdown pass.  The Steelers would add onto their lead in the second quarter with a 33-yard field goal from kicker Shaun Suisham.  The Patriots answered with quarterback Tom Brady completing a 2-yard touchdown pass to wide receiver Deion Branch, yet Pittsburgh struck back with Roethlisberger connecting with wide receiver Antonio Brown on a 7-yard touchdown pass.  New England would close out the half with kicker Stephen Gostkowski got a 46-yard field goal.

The Steelers began the third quarter with a 21-yard field goal from Suisham, followed by his 23-yard field goal in the fourth.  The Patriots tried to rally as Brady completed a 1-yard touchdown pass to tight end Aaron Hernandez, yet Pittsburgh's defense held with safety Troy Polamalu forcing a New England fumble out of the back of the end zone for a safety.

With the win, the Steelers improved to 6–2 and also won their first game against the Patriots since 2008 and first game against the Patriots with Tom Brady as the starter since 2004. This would be the Steelers' final win against the Patriots until 2018.

Week 9: vs. Baltimore Ravens

Following their victory over the Patriots, the Steelers remained at home the next week for their second match-up of the season against division rivals the Baltimore Ravens.  The Ravens scored first with an 18-yard field goal by kicker Billy Cundiff, the only points scored in the first quarter by either team.  Steelers kicker Shaun Suisham answered with a 36-yard field goal early in the second quarter, and a 30-yard field goal near the end, but both of these were quickly matched by Baltimore's Cundiff with a 43-yard and 51-yard field goal, respectively, giving Baltimore a 9–6 lead at halftime.  The Ravens then increased their lead in the third quarter when Ray Rice scored the first touchdown of the game on a 4-yard run.  The Steelers rallied hard in the fourth quarter, with running back Rashard Mendenhall making a 1-yard run to score a touchdown, and then taking the lead for the first time in the game when quarterback Ben Roethlisberger made a successful 25-yard pass to wide receiver Mike Wallace in the endzone for a second touchdown.  On their final drive of the game, the Steelers were ready to potentially increase their lead with a 47-yard field goal kick by Shaun Suisham, but a 5-yard delay of game penalty put them out of field goal range and they were instead forced to punt the ball to the Ravens.  The Ravens then began a 92-yard drive, culminating in a 26-yard touchdown pass by quarterback Joe Flacco to wide receiver Torrey Smith in the endzone with just 8 seconds remaining, giving them the game.

With the loss, the Steelers fell to 6–3.

Week 10: at Cincinnati Bengals

Hoping to rebound from their season-sweeping loss to the Ravens, the Steelers flew to Paul Brown Stadium for a Week 10 AFC North duel with the Cincinnati Bengals.  Pittsburgh delivered the game's opening punch in the first quarter with quarterback Ben Roethlisberger finding wide receiver Jerricho Cotchery on a 16-yard touchdown pass, followed by a 2-yard touchdown run from running back Rashard Mendenhall.  The Bengals would answer with quarterback Andy Dalton completing a 36-yard touchdown pass to wide receiver A. J. Green.  Cincinnati struck again the second quarter with kicker Mike Nugent getting a 43-yard field goal, yet the Steelers responded with a 39-yard field goal from kicker Shaun Suisham.

The Bengals would tie the game in the third quarter with Dalton completing a 1-yard touchdown pass to tight end Jermaine Gresham, yet Pittsburgh came right back with a 9-yard touchdown run from Mendenhall.  Afterwards, the defense would prevent any comeback attempt from Cincinnati.

With the win, the Steelers went into their bye week at 7–3.

Week 12: at Kansas City Chiefs

Coming off their bye week, the Steelers flew to Arrowhead Stadium for a Week 12 Sunday night showdown with the Kansas City Chiefs.  Pittsburgh trailed early in the first quarter when Chiefs kicker Ryan Succop kicked a 41-yard field goal.  Pittsburgh would answer in the second quarter with a 21-yard field goal from kicker Shaun Suisham following a Chiefs goal-line stand. The Steelers struck again when quarterback Ben Roethlisberger threw a 2-yard touchdown pass to rookie tight end Weslye Saunders. Succop and Shuisham each made 49-yard field goals before the end of the half to make it 13–6. The third quarter was scoreless, but in the 4th quarter Kansas City pulled closer when Succop booted a 40-yarder. This pulled the Chiefs to within 13–9. However, Pittsburgh's defense held on to preserve the victory as cornerback Keenan Lewis sealed the deal with an interception late in the 4th quarter with 29 seconds remaining.

With the win, the Steelers improved to 8–3.

Week 13: vs. Cincinnati Bengals

Coming off their Sunday night win over the Chiefs, the Steelers went home for a Week 13 AFC North rematch with the Cincinnati Bengals. In the first quarter, Cincinnati threatened to score after Bengals wide receiver A. J. Green caught a 43-yard pass from quarterback Andy Dalton. Tight end Jermaine Gresham appeared to catch a 7-yard touchdown pass from Dalton, but it was nullified because of a false start penalty on Green. The Bengals lined up for a field goal, but could not get the kick off in time, causing a delay of game. After the five-yard penalty, the Bengals lined up for the field goal again. But this time, Pittsburgh's Cameron Heyward blocked the field goal, giving the Steelers the ball around the 20-yard line. Pittsburgh could not capitalize however, and punted it away. The rest of the 1st quarter was scoreless. Then in the 2nd quarter, the Steelers began a scoring frenzy. The first of Pittsburgh's 4 touchdowns came when Rashard Mendenhall ran in a score from 3 yards out to give Pittsburgh a 7–0 lead. He scored again on the Steelers' next drive, this time from 5 yards out. Pittsburgh scored yet again on their following drive when Ben Roethlisberger threw a 12-yard touchdown pass to Mike Wallace. Down 21–0, the Bengals finally got into the end zone. After a long drive going 80 yards, Dalton threw an 11-yard touchdown pass to Green. Though the Bengals brought the game to within 21–7, the Steelers would not let up. Pittsburgh answered Cincinnati with a 60-yard punt return by Antonio Brown, This gave the Steelers a 28–7 lead going into halftime. In the 3rd Quarter, Pittsburgh scored one more time when Roethlisberger threw a 19-yard touchdown pass to Wallace. Afterwards, Pittsburgh's defense held Cincinnati to no scoring. Led by James Harrison, who finished the game with 3 sacks, they held Cincinnati to only 232 net yards.

With the win, the Steelers improved to 9–3.

Week 14: vs. Cleveland Browns

Coming off their season-sweeping win over the Bengals, the Steelers stayed at home, donned their throwback uniforms again, and played a Week 14 AFC North duel with the Cleveland Browns on Thursday night.  Pittsburgh trailed early in the first quarter as Browns kicker Phil Dawson got a 20-yard field goal.  The Steelers would answer with quarterback Ben Roethlisberger finding wide receiver Jerricho Cotchery on an 11-yard touchdown pass.  After a scoreless second and third quarter (which saw Roethlisberger suffer a left high-ankle sprain near the end of the first half and yet returned for the start of the second), Pittsburgh pulled away in the fourth quarter with Roethlisberger hooking up with wide receiver Antonio Brown on a 79-yard touchdown pass.

With the win, the Steelers improved to 10–3.

Week 15: at San Francisco 49ers

Coming off their divisional home win over the Browns, the Steelers flew to Candlestick Park for a Week 15 interconference duel with the San Francisco 49ers on Monday night. The start of the game was delayed 30 minutes due to a transformer blew out power to the stadium. When the game started Pittsburgh trailed in the first half with 49ers kicker David Akers getting a 22-yard field goal in the first quarter, followed by a 38-yard field goal in the second quarter.

The Steelers would answer in the third quarter with a 51-yard field goal from kicker Shaun Suisham, but San Francisco came right back with quarterback Alex Smith completing a 1-yard touchdown pass to tight end Vernon Davis.  The 49ers would pull away in the fourth quarter with running back Frank Gore getting a 5-yard touchdown run.

With the loss, Pittsburgh fell to 10–4.

Week 16: vs. St. Louis Rams

Hoping to rebound from their road loss to the 49ers, the Steelers went home for a Week 16 interconference duel with the St. Louis Rams.  With Ben Roethlisberger recovering from his left high ankle sprain, backup quarterback Charlie Batch got the start.

Pittsburgh delivered the game's opening punch in the first quarter with a 21-yard field goal from kicker Shaun Suisham.  The Steelers added onto their lead in the second quarter with a 10-yard touchdown run from rookie running back John Clay, which was his first career carry.

Pittsburgh continued to increase their lead in the third quarter with a 49-yard field goal from Suisham.  Afterwards, the Steelers pulled away in the fourth quarter with a 1-yard touchdown run from running back Rashard Mendenhall, followed by a 2-yard touchdown run from running back Isaac Redman.

With the shutout win, Pittsburgh improved to 11–4.

Week 17: at Cleveland Browns

Coming off their shutout home win over the Rams, the Steelers closed out the regular season at Cleveland Browns Stadium with a Week 17 AFC North rematch against the Cleveland Browns.  After a scoreless first quarter, Pittsburgh trailed in the second quarter with Browns kicker Phil Dawson getting a 26-yard and a 45-yard field goal.  The Steelers would close out the half with a 19-yard field goal from kicker Shaun Suisham.

Pittsburgh took the lead in the third quarter with a 29-yard field goal from Suisham, followed by a 7-yard touchdown run from running back Isaac Redman.  Cleveland responded with Dawson making a 49-yard field goal, yet the defense prevented the Browns from getting any other score.

With the win, the Steelers concluded their regular season with a 12–4 record and would acquire the AFC's #5 seed.

Standings

Postseason

Schedule

Postseason game summaries

AFC Wild Card: at #4 Denver Broncos

The Steelers finished 12–4 and would be the AFC's number 5 seed, playing the number 4 seed 8–8 Denver Broncos. They led 6–0 after the first quarter, but the Broncos scored 20 unanswered points, and as a result they had a 20–6 lead at halftime. The Steelers then regrouped after the second quarter debacle and only allowed a Matt Prater field goal. They recovered a key fumble in the fourth quarter that set up the tying touchdown. The Steelers had one last possession at the end of regulation, but Ben Roethlisberger was sacked on the hail mary attempt which forced overtime with the game tied at 23. This game then became notable for being the first non-sudden death overtime game in NFL history, with the new playoff overtime rules. However, the new rules only applied if the team that got the ball first did not score a touchdown, because if a touchdown or safety was scored at any time, the game would end. This meant that only field goals could be kicked and not end the game. The Steelers lost the overtime coin toss, and the Broncos elected to receive. Shaun Suisham delivered a kick out of the back of the end zone for a touchback, but on the first play, the Steeler defense allowed Demaryius Thomas to go from the Denver 20 all the way to the end zone for a touchdown, ending the Steelers' season.

Staff

Final roster

References

External links 
 2011 Pittsburgh Steelers season at Pro Football Reference
 2011 Pittsburgh Steelers season statistics at jt-sw.com
 

Pittsburgh
Pittsburgh Steelers seasons
2010s in Pittsburgh
2011 in sports in Pennsylvania